Alan Alexander Lowing (born 7 January 1988) is a Scottish former professional footballer who played as a right-back.

Career

Rangers
Lowing was born in Rutherglen. He made his first team debut for Rangers on 20 September 2005 in a Scottish League Cup match against Clyde at Ibrox. He played the full 120 minutes of the match with Rangers running out as eventually winners by 5–2. His first league appearance for the Gers was on 1 October 2005 when he replaced Barry Ferguson and played the final 13 minutes in Rangers 5–1 win over Dunfermline Athletic. He made his second start in a Scottish Premier League game against Dundee United on 31 December and was used as a second-half substitute in the 5–0 win over Peterhead in the third round of the Scottish Cup. However, the return of Alan Hutton and injury kept Lowing out of both the team for the remainder of the season. He made his full European debut against Partizan Belgrade at Ibrox on 14 December 2006.

In November 2007, Lowing signed a one-year extension to his Rangers deal to remain with the club until 2009. Lowing signed a new six-month contract extension in June 2009. In total Lowing played 5 first team games for Rangers.

Clyde
On 30 August 2008, Lowing signed for Clyde on loan until January 2009, along with fellow Rangers youth Paul Emslie. He made his Clyde debut on the same day, playing the full 90 minutes in a 3–2 victory over St Johnstone. The loan deal was extended at the end of 2008, until the end of January 2009. He made 19 appearances for the Bully Wee in all competitions.

East Fife
On 5 March 2010, Lowing joined East Fife on a deal until the end of the season. He had left Rangers in January after his contract had expired.  His contract with East Fife was not renewed, as he had got injured in a game while at the club and it looked like he would be out of action for a while.

Fram
On 15 April 2011, Lowing joined Fram Reykjavik on a two-week trial. After impressing, he signed a permanent deal with the club on 29 April 2011.

Víkingur
On 11 November 2013, Lowing joined Víkingur Reykjavik on a one-year contract. Putting together a string of impressive performances in his first season with Víkingur he signed a new two-year contract with the club on 12 September 2014.

Lowing left Víkingur in 2017 and subsequently announced his retirement from football.

References

External links

1988 births
Living people
Sportspeople from Rutherglen
Association football fullbacks
Scottish footballers
Scottish Premier League players
Rangers F.C. players
Clyde F.C. players
East Fife F.C. players
Scottish Football League players
Knattspyrnufélagið Víkingur players
Knattspyrnufélagið Fram players
Expatriate footballers in Iceland
Scotland youth international footballers
Scottish expatriate footballers
Footballers from South Lanarkshire